The Fouladi (alternatively Polada, Poladha, Puladi); is a tribe of Hazara found in Afghanistan, of the Southern branch of Hazara.  Per several references, the Poladha are among the eight overarching Hazara tribes.

One study indicated that Maknak, Kalo Zaida, Khurdak Zaida, Kim Sung, Maradina are also subset of Poladha; especially the Dahla tribe (possibly extinct) was a subset of the Poladha.

See also

List of Hazara tribes

References

Hazara people
Hazara tribes